Pavol Michálik  (born 29 November 1951) was a former Slovak football goalkeeper. He played for Dukla Banská Bystrica, FC Baník Ostrava and ŠK Slovan Bratislava. His surname was written wrong in his career life as Michalík.

Club career
Michálik played in 209 Czechoslovak First League matches, most of them with FC Baník Ostrava. He won the Czechoslovak First League three times with Baník, in 1976, 1980 and 1981. He finished his career with Panserraikos in the Greek Super League.

International career
Michálik made eleven appearances for the full Czechoslovakia national football team.

References

External links

1951 births
Czechoslovak footballers
Slovak footballers
Czechoslovakia international footballers
ŠK Slovan Bratislava players
FC Baník Ostrava players
Panserraikos F.C. players
Living people
Expatriate footballers in Greece
Association football goalkeepers
Czechoslovak expatriate sportspeople in Greece
Czechoslovak expatriate footballers